Ice hockey at the 2011 Canada Winter Games was held at the Halifax Metro Centre and Halifax Forum in Halifax and the Dartmouth Sportsplex in Dartmouth, Nova Scotia.

The men's tournament was held during the first week, between February 12 and 18, and the women's tournament was held during the second week, between February 20 and 26.

Medalists

Venues
The tournament was hosted in two host cities.

Men

Group A 

All times are local (UTC-4).

Group B 

The three teams finished tied for second were ranked according to goal differential between the games played amongst themselves.
All times are local (UTC-4).

Group C 

All times are local (UTC-4).

Qualification round

Placement

Eleventh-place match

Ninth-place match

Quarter-finals

5–8th place Bracket

7th-place match

5th-place match

Semi-finals

Bronze-medal match

Gold-medal match

Final standings

Women

Group A 

All times are local (UTC-4).

Group B 

All times are local (UTC-4).

Semi-finals

Bronze-medal match

Gold-medal match

Final standings

References

2011 Canada Winter Games
Games
2011 Canada Winter Games